The Pennsylvania Republican Party (PAGOP) is the affiliate of the Republican Party in the state of Pennsylvania. It is headquartered in Harrisburg.

History

Founding
The party was founded on November 27, 1854, in Towanda (Bradford County) by former Congressman David Wilmot. Wilmot invited a small group of friends and political leaders to the organization's first meeting, which took place in his home. Among the attendees were Senator Simon Cameron, Congressman Thaddeus Stevens, Colonel Alexander McClure and future Governor Andrew Curtin. Wilmot convinced the group to form local Republican Clubs in their home counties. George Bloom made the Republican Party a statewide organization in 1959. He had the headquarters located in Harrisburg, where it remains to this day.

Overview
Pennsylvania was dominated politically by the Democratic Party until around 1856. This is at least partially attributed to the desire of many in the state to promote its growing industries by raising taxes. From the period immediately preceding the Civil until the mid-1930s, political dominance in the state largely rested with the Republican Party. The party was led by a series of bosses, including Simon Cameron, J. Donald Cameron, Matthew Quay, and Boies Penrose. Quay in particular was one of the dominant political figures of his era, as he served as chairman of the Republican National Committee and helped place Theodore Roosevelt on the 1900 Republican ticket. During the period from the Civil War until the start of the Great Depression, Republican gubernatorial administrations outnumbered Democratic administrations by a margin of sixteen to two. Republican dominance was ended by the growing influence of labor and urbanization, and the implementation of the New Deal. However, even after the New Deal, Republicans continued to control the governorship until George M. Leader's election in 1954, and Republicans remain competitive in the state.

Governorship

The first Republican governor was elected in 1861, and there was a Republican governor until 1883. The governorship alternated between Democrat and Republican every term until 1895. From 1895 until 1935, the GOP held an unbroken grip on the governor's office. Democrat George Howard Earle held the governorship for one term, from 1935 to 1939, after which time Republicans held the governorship until the 1954 election of state senator George Leader. Democrats continued to hold the governorship into 1963, following the 1958 election of Pittsburgh Mayor David Lawrence to succeed Leader.

Republicans Bill Scranton and Ray Shafer followed Lawrence. In 1968, state law was changed to allow governors to run for a second four-year term. However, in the 1970 election (the first which allowed the winner the opportunity to run for a second term), Democrat Milton Shapp defeated Shafer's Lieutenant Governor, Ray Broderick. Shapp was re-elected over GOP nominee Drew Lewis in 1974.

Recent political history

Presidential elections
After Democrat Jimmy Carter's victory in 1976 (in which he carried the state), Pennsylvania was carried by the Republican presidential nominee in three consecutive elections. In 1980, Ronald Reagan won 49.6% of the popular vote and Carter received 42.5%. In 1984 Reagan acquired 53% of the votes. In 1988 George Bush won with 50.7% of the popular vote against Michael Dukakis who obtained 48.4%. In 1992, Pennsylvania was carried by Democrat Bill Clinton, who received 45.1% of the popular vote and Republican Bush got 36.1%. In 1996 Clinton again carried the state with 49.2% of the vote against Bob Dole's 40%. Al Gore carried the state with 50.6% of the vote in 2000 and Bush only received 46.4%. Democrat John Kerry became the fourth straight Democratic presidential nominee to carry the state in 2004 receiving 51% and Bush obtained 48.3% of the votes.

State and congressional elections
Republicans held both US Senate seats from 1968 to 1991. In 1991, after the death of Senator John Heinz, a special election was held. In the election, former Kennedy administration official and Democrat Harris Wofford defeated former governor Dick Thornburgh, who resigned as President Bush's Attorney General to run in the election. The Republican defeat was considered to be a major upset. Wofford went on to be defeated in his bid for a full six-year term in 1994 by Congressman Rick Santorum. Republicans would hold both of Pennsylvania's Senate seats until Santorum was defeated in his bid for a third term in 2006.

In 1992, Democrats had the majorities in both houses of the General Assembly for the first time since 1978. Following the 1994 state and federal elections, Republicans regained the majority in both houses of the General Assembly, as well as a majority of the state's Congressional seats.

In 1998, 42% of Pennsylvania's registered voters were Republican, 48% were Democrats, and the other 9% were either unaffiliated or with other parties.

By 2003, there were 12 Republicans and seven Democrats in the state's U.S. House delegation, as well as 29 Republicans and 21 Democrats in the state Senate, and 109 Republicans and 94 Democrats in the state House.

2006 general election
Two statewide elections took place in 2006. In the U.S. Senate race, State Treasurer Bob Casey, Jr., son of former Governor Bob Casey, Sr., won nearly 59% of the vote, defeating incumbent Republican Rick Santorum. Santorum's margin of defeat was 18 points—the largest for an incumbent Republican Senator in state history. Casey also became the first Democrat elected to a full Senate term from Pennsylvania since Joseph Clark was re-elected in 1962. In the gubernatorial election, incumbent Democratic Governor Ed Rendell won a comfortable re-election over Republican challenger Lynn Swann. Rendell took 60% of the votes cast, while Swann took the remaining 40%.

Democrats also retook the majority in the State House this year, though the balance-of-power in the State Senate remained the same.

2008 general election
In 2008, Democrat Barack Obama won Pennsylvania's 21 electoral votes with a total of about 3.2 million votes (54.7%). The Republican nominee, John McCain, won about 2.7 million votes (44.3%).

There were also three other statewide elections that year. Republican State Attorney General Tom Corbett was re-elected with 52.4% of the vote, defeating Democrat John Morganelli. Republicans have held the office of Attorney General since it became an elected one in 1980. The State Auditor General, Democrat Jack Wagner, was re-elected with 59% of the vote, while Democrat Rob McCord was elected State Treasurer with 55% of the vote.

2009 municipal election
There were three major statewide judicial contests in 2009. In the election for Justice of the State Supreme Court, Republican Joan Orie Melvin garnered about 900,000 votes (53.2%), defeating Democrat Jack Panella, who garnered about 800,000 votes (46.8%).

The other two elections were for the state's two intermediate appellate courts. In the election for four judges to the State Superior Court, there were nine candidates. Of the winners, three were Republicans and one Democrat. Additionally, in the election for two judges to the Commonwealth Court, Republicans Patricia McCullough and Kevin Broboson came-out on top of a four-candidate field.

2010 general election
There were two statewide elections held in Pennsylvania in 2010. In the election for United States Senate, Republican nominee Pat Toomey garnered about 2.2 million votes (51%), defeating Democrat Joe Sestak, who garnered about 1.9 million votes (49%). Sestak had defeated incumbent Senator Arlen Specter in the Democratic primary after Specter, who had been a Republican since his election to the Senate in 1980, switched his partisan affiliation to Democratic. Specter's partisan defection had briefly given Democrats control of both of Pennsylvania's Senate seats for the first time since before the Civil War. In the gubernatorial election, Tom Corbett garnered about 2.1 million votes (54.5%), defeating Democrat Dan Onorato, who garnered about 1.8 million votes (45.5%).

Republicans also retook the majority in the State House, which was captured by Democrats in 2006. The party maintained its majority in the State Senate, which it has held since 1994.

2014 general election

Incumbent Republican Governor Tom Corbett ran for re-election to a second term but was defeated by Democrat Tom Wolf. This marked the first time an incumbent Governor running for re-election in Pennsylvania lost.

Current elected officials
The Pennsylvania Republican Party control three of the five statewide offices and holds a majority in the Pennsylvania State Senate. Republicans hold none of the state's U.S. Senate seats, 8 of the state's 17 House seats, and a minority in the Pennsylvania House of Representatives.

Members of Congress

U.S. Senate
None

U.S. House of Representatives

Statewide offices
Michelle Henry - Acting Attorney General of Pennsylvania
Stacy Garrity - Treasurer of Pennsylvania
Timothy DeFoor - Auditor General of Pennsylvania

Legislative leadership
President pro tempore of the Senate: Kim Ward
Senate Majority Leader: Joe Pittman
House Minority Leader: Bryan Cutler

Party leadership

Current
Lawrence Tabas, Chair
Bernie Comfort, Vice Chair
Angela Nielsen Alleman, Executive Director
Andy Reilly, National Committeeman
Christine Toretti, National Committeewoman
Deputy Chairman, Calvin Tucker
Mike Baker, Treasurer
Liz Preate Havey, Secretary
Mary Barket, Assistant Secretary

Previous
Robert Gleason, Chairman, 2006-2017
Eileen Melvin, Chairwoman, 2004-2006
Alan Novak, Chairman, 1996-2004
Anne Anstine, Chairwoman, 1990-1996
Earl Baker, Chairman, 1986-1990
Bob Asher, Chairman, 1983-1986
Marion Margery Scranton, Vice Chair, 1926-1928

Current membership by county 
Most members are elected every four years in the Republican primary election by county. Each county party chairman is a state committee member by virtue of office.

The breakdown of members per county, along with caucus of county is as follows:

See also
Elections in Pennsylvania
Green Party of Pennsylvania
Libertarian Party of Pennsylvania
Pennsylvania Democratic Party
Politics of Pennsylvania

References

External links
Republican Party of Pennsylvania

1854 establishments in Pennsylvania
Political parties established in 1854
Organizations based in Harrisburg, Pennsylvania
Republican State Committee
Pennsylvania